Thyada barbicornis is a species of beetle in the family Cerambycidae, and the only species in the genus Thyada. It was described by Pascoe in 1859.

References

Beetles described in 1859